Mikhail Nikolayevich Tukhachevsky ( – 12 June 1937), nicknamed the Red Napoleon by foreign newspapers, was a Soviet general who was prominent between 1918 and 1937 as a military officer and theoretician.

After service in World War I of 1914–1917 and in the Russian Civil War of 1917–1923, from 1920 to 1921 he commanded the Soviet Western Front in the Polish–Soviet War. Soviet forces under his command successfully repelled the  Polish forces from Western Ukraine, driving them back into Poland, but the Red Army suffered defeat outside of Warsaw, and the war ended in a Soviet defeat. He later served as chief of staff of the Red Army from 1925 through 1928, as assistant in the People's Commissariat of Defense after 1934 and as commander of the Volga Military District in 1937. He achieved the rank of Marshal of the Soviet Union in 1935.

As a major proponent of modernisation of Soviet armament and army force structure in the 1920s and 1930s, he became instrumental in the development of Soviet aviation, and of  mechanized and airborne forces. As a theoretician, he was a driving force behind the Soviet development of the theory of deep operations in the 1920s and 1930s. Soviet authorities accused Tukhachevsky of treason, and after confessing during torture he was executed in 1937 during Stalin's military purges of 1936–1938.

Early life 

Tukhachevsky was born at Alexandrovskoye, Safonovsky District (in the present-day Smolensk Oblast of Russia), into a family of impoverished hereditary nobles. Legend states that his family descended from a Flemish count who ended up stranded in the East during the Crusades and took a Turkish wife before settling in Russia. His great-grandfather Alexander Tukhachevsky (1793–1831) served as a colonel in the Imperial Russian Army. He was of Russian ethnicity.

World War I
At the outset of the First World War he joined the Semyenovsky Guards Regiment (July 1914) as a second lieutenant, declaring:

I am convinced that all that is needed in order to achieve what I want is bravery and self-confidence. I certainly have enough self-confidence.... I told myself that I shall either be a general at thirty, or that I shall not be alive by then.

Taken prisoner by the Imperial German Army in February 1915, Tukhachevsky escaped four times from prisoner-of-war camps and was finally held as an incorrigible escapee in Ingolstadt fortress in Bavaria.

Captivity in Ingolstadt 
There he met Le Monde journalist Remy Roure and shared a cell with Captain Charles de Gaulle. Tukhachevsky played his violin, spouted nihilist beliefs and spoke against Jews, whom he called dogs who "spread their fleas throughout the world".  Roure, under the pseudonym of Pierre Fervacque, wrote about his encounter with Tukhachevsky. He reported that Tukhachevsky highly praised Napoleon, and also in a certain conversation, Tukhachevsky said he hated Jews for bringing Christianity and the "morality of capital" to Russia. Roure then asked him if he was a socialist, and he replied:

According to Roure, Tukhachevsky said that he would only follow Lenin if he "de-europeanised and threw Russia into barbarism", but feared Lenin would not do that. After ranting about how he could use Marxism as a justification to secure the territorial aims of the Tsars and cement Russia's position as a world power, he laughed and said he was only joking. Roure said the laugh had an ironic and despairing tone.

In another, different occasion, following the February Revolution, Roure observed Tukhachevsky carving a "scary idol from colored cardboard", with "burning eyes", a "gaping mouth", and a "bizarre and terrible nose". He inquired about its purpose, to which Tukhachevsky responded:

Tukhachevsky's apparent neo-paganism was also corroborated by another prisoner at Ingolstadt, who recalled that he once saw a "scarecrow" in the corner of Tukhachevsky's cell, and upon asking him as to what it was, Tukhachevsky responded (to what Tsurikov interpreted as heavy sarcasm), that it was an effigy of Yarilo (the Slavic god of vegetation, fertility and springtime), which he had created during Shrovetide.

Tukhachevsky never denied, and later even confirmed, these stories about his imprisonment in Germany, but always said that he was politically immature in 1917 and greatly regretted his early views. In France 1936, when confronted with what Roure wrote about him, he said that he had read his book and stated the following:I was still very young... a novice at politics, and all I knew about revolutions was the last phase of the citizens' revolution in France: the Bonapartism whose military triumphs filled me with boundless admiration. (...) I never think of my views at Ingolstadt without regretting them, since they could cause doubts about my devotion to the Soviet motherland. I'm taking advantage of our reunion to tell you my true feelings.Whether or not Tukhachevsky really gave up on his old views, the assertion that he was a fully-fledged Bolshevik by the time he joined them is most likely not true.

Tukhachevsky's fifth escape met with success, and after crossing the Swiss-German border, carrying with him some small pagan idols, he returned to Russia in September 1917. Following the October Revolution of 1917, Tukhachevsky joined the Bolsheviks and went on to play a key role in the Red Army – despite his noble ancestry.

Russian Civil War

He became an officer in the newly established Red Army and rapidly advanced in rank because of his great ability. During the Russian Civil War, he was given responsibility for defending Moscow. The Bolshevik Defence Commissar, Leon Trotsky, gave Tukhachevsky command of the 5th Army in 1919, and he led the campaign to capture Siberia from the anticommunist White forces of Aleksandr Kolchak. Tukhachevsky used concentrated attacks to exploit the enemy's open flanks and threaten them with envelopment. According to Tukhachevsky's close confidant Leonid Sabaneyev, in 1918, when he was in the service of the Military Department of the All-Russian Central Executive Committee, in his last overt display of neopaganism, Tukhachevsky drew up a project for destruction of Christianity and restoration of Slavic paganism. To this end, Tukhachevsky submitted a memo on declaring paganism as the state religion of the RSFSR, which although mocked, also received some serious discussion in the Small Council of People's Commissars, which commended Tukhachevsky for his "joke" and his commitment to atheism. Sabaneyev observed that Tukhachevsky seemed "as happy as a schoolboy who had just succeeded in a prank."

He also helped defeat General Anton Denikin in the Crimea in 1920, conducting the final operations. In February 1920, he launched an offensive into the Kuban, using cavalry to disrupt the enemy's rear. In the retreat that followed, Denikin's force disintegrated, and Novorossiysk was evacuated hastily.

In the final stage of the civil war, Tukhachevsky commanded the 7th Army during the suppression of the Kronstadt rebellion in March 1921. He also commanded the assault against the Tambov Republic between 1921 and 1922. British historian Simon Sebag Montefiore has described Tukhachevsky as being "as ruthless as any Bolshevik". He was known for using summary execution of hostages and poison gas in his suppression of peasant uprisings.

Polish-Soviet War

Tukhachevsky commanded the Soviet invasion of Poland during the Polish-Soviet War in 1920. In the lead-up to hostilities, Tukhachevsky concentrated his troops near Vitebsk, which he theatrically dubbed, "The Gates of Smolensk". When he issued his troops orders to cross the border, Tukhachevsky said, "The fate of world revolution is being decided in the west: the way leads over the corpse of Poland to a universal conflagration.... On to Wilno, Minsk, and Warsaw -- forward!"

According to Richard M. Watt, "The boldness of Tukhachevsky's drive westward was the key to his success. The Soviet High Command dispatched 60,000 men as reinforcements, but Tukhachevsky never stopped to let them catch up. His onrushing armies were leaving behind greater numbers of stragglers every day, but Tukhachevsky ignored these losses. His supply services were in chaos and his rear scarcely existed as an organized entity, but Tukhachevsky was unconcerned; his men would live off the land. On the day his troops captured Minsk, a new cry arose--'Give us Warsaw!' Tukhachevsky was determined to give them what they wanted. All things considered, Tukhachevsky's performance was a virtuoso display of energy, determination, and, indeed, rashness."

His armies were defeated by Józef Piłsudski outside Warsaw. It was during the Polish war that Tukhachevsky first came into conflict with Stalin. Both blamed the other for the Soviet failure to capture Warsaw. Tukhachevsky later lamented:

His book about the war was translated into Polish and published together with a book by Piłsudski.

Reform of the Red Army

Tukhachevsky fervently criticised the Red Army's performance during the 1926 Summer manoeuvres. He criticised the officers' inability to determine what course of action to take and communicate that with their troops especially harshly. Tukhachevsky noted that initiative among officers was lacking, that they responded slowly to changes in the situation and that communication was poor. This was not purely the officers' fault as the only way of communication from local unit headquarters to the field positions was a single telephone line. In contrast German divisions mobilised shortly after during the interwar period had telephones, radio, horse, cycle and motorcycle messengers, signal lights and flags and pieces of cloth with which messages were to be conveyed mostly to aircraft.

Tukhachevsky reached the position of 1st deputy commissar for defence to commissar for defence Kliment Voroshilov. Voroshilov disliked Tukhachevsky and would later be one of the initiators of the great purge which wouldn't benefit Tukhachevsky's safety. According to Zhukov it was Tukhachevsky and not Voroshilov who ran the ministry in practice. While Voroshilov disliked Tukhachevsky, his perception of military doctrine was nonetheless impacted significantly by Tukhachevsky's ideas.

According to Simon Sebag Montefiore, Stalin regarded Tukhachevsky as his bitterest rival and dubbed him Napoleonchik (little Napoleon). Upon Stalin's ascension to Party leadership in 1929, he began receiving denunciations from senior officers who disapproved of Tukhachevsky's tactical theories. Then, in 1930, the Joint State Political Directorate forced two officers to testify that Tukhachevsky was plotting to overthrow the Politburo via a coup d'état.

According to Montefiore:

Following this, Tukhachevsky wrote several books on modern warfare and, in 1931, after Stalin had accepted the need for an industrialized military, Tukhachevsky was given a leading role in reforming the army. He held advanced ideas on military strategy, particularly on use of tanks and aircraft in combined operations.

Tukhachevsky took a keen interest in the arts, and became a political patron and close friend of composer Dmitri Shostakovich; they met in 1925 and subsequently played music together at the Marshal's home (Tukhachevsky played the violin). In 1936, Shostakovich's music was under attack following the Pravda denunciation of his opera Lady Macbeth of Mtsensk. However, Tukhachevsky intervened with Stalin on his friend's behalf. After Tukhachevsky's arrest, pressure was put on Shostakovich to denounce him, but he was saved from doing so by the fact that the investigator was himself arrested.

Theory of deep operation

Tukhachevsky is often credited with the theory of deep operation in which combined arms formations strike deep behind enemy lines to destroy the enemy's rear and logistics, but his exact role is unclear and disputed because of shortage of firsthand sources, and his published works containing only limited amounts of theory on the subject. The theories were opposed by some in the military establishment but were largely adopted by the Red Army in the mid-1930s. They were expressed as a concept in the Red Army's Field Regulations of 1929 and more fully developed in the 1935 Instructions on Deep Battle. The concept was finally codified into the army in 1936 in the Provisional Field Regulations of 1936. An early example of potential effectiveness of deep operations can be found in the Soviet victory over Japan at the Battle of Khalkhin Gol (Nomonhan), where a Soviet Corps under the command of Georgy Zhukov defeated a substantial Japanese force in August and September 1939.

It is often stated that the widespread purges of the Red Army officer corps in 1937 to 1939 made "deep operations" briefly fall from favour. However, they were certainly a major part of Soviet doctrine after their efficacy was demonstrated by the Battle of Khalkin Gol and the success of similar German operations in Poland and France. They were used with great success during World War II on the Eastern Front, in such victories as the Battle of Stalingrad  and Operation Bagration.

Fall and death

On November 20, 1935, Tukhachevsky was made a Marshal of the Soviet Union when he was 42. In January 1936, Tukhachevsky visited the United Kingdom, France, and Germany.

Just before his arrest, Tukhachevsky was relieved of duty as assistant to Marshal Voroshilov and appointed military commander of the Volga Military District. Shortly after departing to take up his new command, he was secretly arrested on May 22, 1937, and brought back to Moscow in a prison van.

Tukhachevsky's interrogation and torture were directly supervised by NKVD Chief Nikolai Yezhov. Stalin instructed Yezhov, "See for yourself, but Tukhachevsky should be forced to tell everything.... It's impossible he acted alone."

According to Montefiore, a few days later, as Yezhov buzzed in and out of Stalin's office, a broken Tukhachevsky confessed that Avel Yenukidze had recruited him in 1928 and that he was a German agent cooperating with Nikolai Bukharin to seize power. Tukhachevsky's confession, which survives in the archives, is dappled with a brown spray that was later found to be blood-spattered by a body in motion.

Stalin commented, "It's incredible, but it's a fact, they admit it."

On June 11, 1937, the Soviet Supreme Court convened a special military tribunal to try Tukhachevsky and eight generals for treason. The trial was dubbed the Case of Trotskyist Anti-Soviet Military Organization. Upon hearing the accusations, Tukhachevsky was heard to say, "I feel I'm dreaming." Most of the judges were also terrified. One was heard to comment, "Tomorrow I'll be put in the same place."

At 11:35 that night, all of the defendants were declared guilty and sentenced to death. Stalin, who was awaiting the verdict with Yezhov, Molotov and Lazar Kaganovich did not even examine the transcripts. He simply said, "Agreed."

Within the hour, Tukhachevsky was summoned from his cell by NKVD captain Vasily Blokhin. As Yezhov watched, the former Marshal was shot once in the back of the head.

Immediately afterward, Yezhov was summoned into Stalin's presence. Stalin asked, "What were Tukhachevsky's last words?" Yezhov responded, "The snake said he was dedicated to the Motherland and Comrade Stalin. He asked for clemency. But it was obvious that he was not being straight, he hadn't laid down his arms."

Aftermath

Tukhachevsky's family members all suffered after his execution. His wife, Nina Tukhachevskaya, and his brothers Alexandr and Nikolai, both instructors in a Soviet military academy, were all shot. Three of his sisters were sent to the Gulag. His underage daughter was arrested when she reached adulthood and remained in the Gulag until the 1950s Khrushchev thaw. She lived in Moscow after her release and died in 1982.

Before Nikita Khrushchev's Secret Speech in 1956, Tukhachevsky was officially considered a fascist and fifth columnist. Soviet diplomats and supporters in the West enthusiastically promulgated this opinion. Then, on January 31, 1957, Tukhachevsky and his codefendants were declared innocent of all charges and were rehabilitated.

Although Tukhachevsky's prosecution is almost universally regarded as a sham, Stalin's motivations continue to be debated. In his 1968 book The Great Terror, British historian Robert Conquest accuses Nazi Party leaders Heinrich Himmler and Reinhard Heydrich of forging documents that implicated Tukhachevsky in an anti-Stalinist conspiracy with the Wehrmacht General Staff, to weaken the Soviet Union's defence capacity. These documents, Conquest said, were leaked to President Edvard Beneš of Czechoslovakia, who passed them to Soviet Russia through diplomatic channels. Conquest's thesis of an SS conspiracy to frame Tukhachevsky was based upon the memoirs of Walter Schellenberg and Beneš.

In 1989, the Politburo of the Communist Party of the Soviet Union announced that new evidence had been found in Stalin's archives indicating German intelligence's intentions to fabricate disinformation about Tukhachevsky with the goal of eliminating him. "Knowledge of personal characteristics of Stalin - like paranoia and extreme suspicion, had been possibly highest factor in it."

According to the opinion of Igor Lukes, who conducted a study on the matter, it was Stalin, Kaganovich and Yezhov who actually concocted Tukhachevsky's "treason" themselves. At Yezhov's order, the NKVD had instructed a known double agent, Nikolai Skoblin, to leak to Heydrich's Sicherheitsdienst (SD) concocted information suggesting a plot by Tukhachevsky and the other Soviet generals against Stalin.

Seeing an opportunity to strike a blow at the Soviet military, Heydrich immediately acted on the information and undertook to improve on it. Heydrich's forgeries were later leaked to the Soviets via Beneš and other neutral nations. While the SD believed that it had successfully fooled Stalin into executing his best generals, in reality, it had merely served as an unwitting pawn of the Soviet NKVD. Ironically, Heydrich's forgeries were never used at trial. Instead, Soviet prosecutors relied on signed "confessions" beaten out of the defendants.

In 1956, NKVD defector Aleksandr Mikhailovich Orlov published an article in Life Magazine with "The Sensational Secret Behind the Damnation of Stalin" as title. The story held that NKVD agents had discovered papers in the tsarist Okhrana archives proving Stalin had once been an informer. From this knowledge, the NKVD agents had planned a coup d'état with Tukhachevsky and other senior officers in the Red Army. According to Orlov, Stalin uncovered the conspiracy and used Yezhov to execute those responsible. The article lists the Eremin letter as documentary evidence that Stalin was part of the Okhrana, but most historians agree it's a forgery.

Simon Sebag Montefiore, who has conducted extensive research in Soviet archives, states:

It has been speculated that the reason why Stalin had Tukhachevsky and other high ranking generals executed was to remove a potential threat to his political power. Ultimately, Stalin and Yezhov would orchestrate the arrest and execution of thousands of Soviet military officers as well as five of the eight generals who presided over Tukhachevsky's show trial.

While at the time of his death the Red Army was still firmly in the grip of the cavalry, Tukhachevsky had changed the Red Army's mentality quite significantly. While many machinists were being arrested and marshal Budyonny spoke in favour of cavalry, influential people — even including marshal Voroshilov, under whom Tukhachevsky served, and who took part in the arrests — began to question the cavalry's position inside the Red Army. The horse remained ingrained in the Red Army, however. In peacetime, cavalry made sense to the Red Army; it was effective in smaller actions and internal security actions, many horse riders were available without requiring significant training, and there were the memories of the effectiveness of cavalry during the Civil War, all of which helped the horse in maintaining its central position inside the Red Army. When the Second World War began mixed units were set up, which included both cavalry and tanks; these played a central role in use of the deep operations doctrine during WWII.

Honours and awards
Imperial awards
 Order of St. Anne, 2nd class with swords, also awarded 3rd class with swords and bow; and 4th class with the inscription "For Courage"
 Order of St. Stanislaus, 2nd class with swords, also awarded 3rd class with swords and bow
 Order of St. Vladimir, 4th class with swords
Soviet awards
 Order of Lenin (21 February 1933)
 Order of the Red Banner (August 7, 1919)
Honorary revolutionary weapon (December 17, 1919)

Work

 Kurt Agricola, "Der rote Marschall. Tuchatschewskis Aufstieg und Fall" (The Red Marshall: The Rise and Fall of Tukhachevsky), 1939, Kleine "Wehrmacht" - Bücherei, 5

References

Further reading

External links

The Red Bonaparte
 

1893 births
1937 deaths
People from Safonovsky District
People from Dorogobuzhsky Uyezd
Bolsheviks
Central Committee of the Communist Party of the Soviet Union candidate members
Marshals of the Soviet Union
Russian military writers
Military theorists
Russian military personnel of World War I
Prisoners of war from the Russian Empire
World War I prisoners of war held by Germany
Escapees from German detention
Soviet military personnel of the Russian Civil War
Soviet military personnel of the Polish–Soviet War
Recipients of the Order of Saint Stanislaus (Russian), 2nd class
Recipients of the Order of St. Anna, 2nd class
Recipients of the Order of St. Vladimir, 4th class
Recipients of the Order of the Red Banner
Recipients of the Order of Lenin
Case of the Trotskyist Anti-Soviet Military Organization
Great Purge victims from Russia
Russian people executed by the Soviet Union
Members of the Communist Party of the Soviet Union executed by the Soviet Union
Executed military personnel
People executed by the Soviet Union by firearm
Soviet rehabilitations
Burials at Donskoye Cemetery
Russian nobility
Russian modern pagans